The Presidential Council of the Hungarian People's Republic was the collective head of state of Hungary during the Communist era. It was created in 1949, following the enactment of a new constitution that year that officially created the People's Republic of Hungary. Originally vested with broad powers during the interim of parliamentary sessions, its jurisdiction was limited throughout the moderate liberalization witnessed during the Kadar era. Along with the state itself, it was abolished on 23 October 1989.

The Parliament of Hungary, upon the recommendation of the Presidential Council, elected and relieved the chairman and ministers of the Council of Ministers of the Hungarian People's Republic of their duties.

List of chairmen of the Presidential Council 

Parties'

List of vice-chairmen of the Presidential Council 

Two vice presidents served simultaneously. They were deputy heads of state.

See also
List of heads of state of Hungary during the Hungarian People's Republic (1949-1989)
List of vice presidents of the Presidential Council of Hungary

Government of Hungary
1949 establishments in Hungary
1989 disestablishments in Hungary
Collective heads of state